The Time Machine is an album by American vibraphonist Gary Burton recorded in 1966 and released on the RCA label. Burton also plays marimba and piano in a trio with bassist Steve Swallow and drummer Larry Bunker.

Reception 
The Allmusic review by Scott Yanow stated: "This Gary Burton LP was a bit unusual in that he overdubbed piano and marimbas in addition to his distinctive vibes... Interesting music overall".

Track listing 
All compositions by Gary Burton except as indicated
 "The Sunset Bell" - 5:04   
 "Six-Nix, Quix, Flix" - 6:08   
 "Interim I" - 1:36   
 "Chega De Saudade (No More Blues)" (Antônio Carlos Jobim, Vinícius de Moraes) - 4:43   
 "Childhood" (Michael Gibbs) - 1:02   
 "Deluge" (Gibbs) - 4:47   
 "Norwegian Wood (This Bird Has Flown)" (John Lennon, Paul McCartney) - 3:26   
 "Interim II" - 0:54   
 "Falling Grace" (Steve Swallow) - 4:00   
 "My Funny Valentine" (Richard Rodgers, Lorenz Hart) - 5:33  
Recorded at RCA Victor's Studio B in New York City on April 5 & 6, 1966.

Personnel 
 Gary Burton — vibraphone, piano, marimba
 Steve Swallow — bass  
 Larry Bunker — drums

References 

RCA Records albums
Gary Burton albums
1966 albums